Marigen Ariadna Julia Hornkohl Venegas (born 25 September 1953) is a Chilean social worker and politician who served as minister during the first government of Michelle Bachelet (2006–2010).

She has a Master of Arts in History at the Heidelberg University.

References

1953 births
Living people
Chilean people
Chilean people of German descent
University of Chile alumni
Heidelberg University alumni
21st-century Chilean politicians
Christian Democratic Party (Chile) politicians